Soroca County may refer to:
 Soroca County (Moldova), a county from 1998 to 2003
 Soroca County (Romania), a county in the Kingdom of Romania